The 2021–22 Morehead State Eagles men's basketball team represented Morehead State University in the 2021–22 NCAA Division I men's basketball season. The Eagles, led by fifth-year head coach Preston Spradlin, played their home games at Ellis Johnson Arena in Morehead, Kentucky as members of the Ohio Valley Conference.

Previous season
The Eagles finished the 2020–21 season 23–8, 17–3 in OVC play to finish in second place. In the OVC tournament, they defeated Southeast Missouri State in the first round, Eastern Kentucky in the semifinals, advancing to the championship game, where they knocked off top-seeded Belmont, earning the Eagles their first trip to the NCAA tournament since 2011. In the NCAA tournament, they received the #14 seed in the Midwest Region, where they would lose to #3 seeded West Virginia in the first round.

Roster

Schedule and results

|-
!colspan=12 style=| Exhibition

|-
!colspan=12 style=| Non-conference regular season

|-
!colspan=12 style=| Ohio Valley regular season

|-
!colspan=9 style=| Ohio Valley tournament

Source

References

Morehead State Eagles men's basketball seasons
Morehead State Eagles
Morehead State Eagles men's basketball
Morehead State Eagles men's basketball